"Bad Boy/Having a Party" is a song by American recording artist Luther Vandross in 1982. The song was released as the first single in support of his album Forever, for Always, for Love. The single became a top five R&B hit which peaked to number-three on the Hot R&B Singles chart, and reached #55 on the Billboard Hot 100. The song was featured during the opening credits of the 1990 film House Party. The bridge samples the chorus from the Sam Cooke song "Having a Party," but with new lyrics added to the end ("you can't go").

Charts

References

External links
 www.luthervandross.com
 Allmusic - Luther Vandross Music

1982 songs
Luther Vandross songs
1982 singles
Songs written by Marcus Miller
Songs written by Luther Vandross
Epic Records singles